The , onetime ruling family of the Jōzai Domain, is a Japanese clan which traces its origins to the Ogasawara clan, the shugo of Shinano Province, and through the Takeda clan, from the Seiwa Genji. The family served the Matsudaira (later Tokugawa) clan from its days in Mikawa Province. It became a family of hatamoto under the Tokugawa shogunate; in 1825, upon receiving a raise in income to 10,000 koku (thanks to the family head Tadafusa, who was then a wakadoshiyori), the Hayashi family entered the ranks of the daimyōs.

The Hayashi family was famous during the Boshin War because of the actions of its head, Hayashi Tadataka, in the fight against the imperial army. The Hayashi became commoners after Tadataka's surrender late in 1868; however, later on in the Meiji period, Tadataka's adopted son Tadahiro received the title of Danshaku (Baron) in the new kazoku system of peerage.

References
Kimura Motoi 木村礎, ed. (1990). Hanshi Daijiten 藩史大事典, Vol. 2. Tokyo: Yūzankaku.
Sasaki Suguru (2004). Boshin Sensō 戊辰戦争. Tokyo: Chuokōron-shinsha.

Further reading
Hayashi Isao 林勲 (1988). Kazusa no Kuni Jōzai Hanshu ichimonji daimyō Hayashi-kōke kankei shiryōshū 上総國請西藩主一文字大名林侯家関係資料集. Kisarazu-shi: Hayashi Eiichi.
Nakamura Akihiko 中村彰彦 (2000). Dappan daimyō no Boshin Sensō: Kazusa Jōzai hanshu Hayashi Tadataka no shōgai 脫藩大名の戊辰戦争: 上総請西藩主 林忠崇の生涯. Tokyo: Chūō kōron shinsha 中央公論新社.

See also
Jōzai Domain
Hayashi clan (disambiguation)

Japanese clans
Ogasawara clan